The Permian Dunkard Group (Pd) is an area of rock, Early Permian in age, in the south of Ohio, southwestern Pennsylvania, West Virginia and the hilltops of the Georges Creek Basin of Maryland. In Ohio, it is found primarily in Washington County. It is notable for being one of the few areas of Permian sediment east of the Mississippi River. In addition, it is the youngest surface rock in the state of Ohio.

Description 
It consists of red and green shale, siltstone, and sandstone, with thin lenticular beds of argillaceous limestone and thin beds of impure coal The base of the layer contains thick-bedded, white conglomeratic sandstone. The layer's thickness is greater than 200 feet in Maryland.

The fossils found in the Dunkard Group are similar to ones found in Texas and Oklahoma of similar age.

Fossil content 

 Dimetrodon
 Ctenospondylus
 Archaeothyris
 Edaphosaurus
 Eryops
 Xenacanthus
 Ophiacodon
 Diploceraspis
 Diplocaulus
 Baldwinonus
 Protorothyris
 Diadectes
 Isodectes
 Sagenodus
 Brachydectes
 Phlegethontia

See also 
 Geology of Pennsylvania

References

Further reading 
 

Geologic groups of Ohio
Geologic groups of Pennsylvania
Geologic groups of West Virginia
Carboniferous System of North America
Permian System of North America
Permian United States
Permian Ohio
Permian geology of Pennsylvania
Permian West Virginia
Sandstone formations of the United States
Shale formations of the United States
Coal formations
Limestone formations
Siltstone formations